Elliott Ferrous-Martin Platt (born February 24, 2004), known professionally as Elyotto (stylized as ElyOtto), is a Canadian musician. He is best known for his song "SugarCrash!", which went viral on TikTok in early 2021.

Life and career 
Elliott Ferrous-Martin Platt was born in 2004 to parents Mike, a musician and songwriter, and Natasha Sayer, a music teacher and musician, and raised in Calgary, Canada.

After getting fired from his job at a pet store in Calgary in spring 2020, ElyOtto committed his time to working on songs and uploading them to SoundCloud. His debut single "SugarCrash!" was released in August 2020. He followed this with his single "Teeth!". "SugarCrash!" went viral on TikTok after ElyOtto posted a video using the song to the platform a week after its release, and he was soon signed to RCA Records.

His debut EP is due for release later in 2022. In April 2021, a remix of "SugarCrash!" featuring Kim Petras and Curtis Waters was released. His single "Profane" was released in August 2021.

Artistry
ElyOtto's music has been described as hyperpop and pop, and he has described his own music as hyperpop and pop. He has called his own music "sweet flashy runway pop" or "evil crusty I've-been-dead-since-1836 pop", and has described hyperpop as "a very trans sounding genre where you can manipulate your voice and use all these crazy flashy synths" that "still feels authentic because of the lyrics." His lyrics often revolve around his gender dysphoria and queer identity, and he regularly uses Auto-Tune on his vocals. Spin referred to ElyOtto as "the face of hyperpop" in April 2021.

Personal life
Platt is transgender. He has described himself as "a little bit on the gender noncomforming side".

Discography

Albums

Singles

As lead artist

As featured artist

References

2004 births
Canadian TikTokers
Canadian electronic musicians
LGBT TikTokers
Living people
RCA Records artists
Transgender male musicians
Canadian transgender people
Canadian LGBT singers
Transgender singers
21st-century Canadian LGBT people
Hyperpop musicians